José Sanchis Sinisterra (born June 28, 1940) is a Spanish playwright and theatre director. He was born in Valencia.  He is best known, outside of Spain, for his award-winning play, ¡Ay Carmela!.

Publications
Ñaque, Ay, Carmela! by José Sanchis Sinisterra (Spanish, paperback), Ediciones Catedra, 1991. 
¡Ay, Carmela! (trans. John London) (English, paperback), New Theatre Publications, 2003. 
Lope de Aguirre, traidor, e-book, Caos Editorial
El lector por horas, e-book, Caos Editorial
Reader by the Hour, e-book, Caos Editorial

References

Spanish dramatists and playwrights
Spanish male dramatists and playwrights
Living people
1940 births